"Message Understood" is the sixth single by the British singer Sandie Shaw. Released in September 1965, it was written by Shaw's usual songwriter Chris Andrews, and became her fifth consecutive top-ten hit single in the UK Singles Chart, reaching number six.

Charts

References

External links
BBC.co.uk review of the Very Best of Sandie Shaw

1965 songs
1965 singles
Sandie Shaw songs
Songs written by Chris Andrews (singer)
Pye Records singles